R. Emmett McAuliffe, Jr. (also known as "Enty") is an American intellectual property and entertainment lawyer from Saint Louis, Missouri. He  hosted several radio shows across the midwest from 1976 to 2008, and now runs the Crazy Days and Nights (CDAN) blog and podcast.

Legal career
McAuliffe is an intellectual property attorney with the law firm of Riezman Berger. He was first admitted to the Missouri bar in 1983. He is the past president of St. Louis Volunteer Lawyers and Accountants for the Arts. He is a member of the Missouri Arts Council.  He is the lawyer for the Digital Content Exchange, a proposed solution to allow free rein of digital media use by internet users while controlling piracy.

Mass Media Career
McAuliffe retired from his side-career in TV and radio in 2008 to devote more time to his other interests including blogging.

In 2020, the scam-tracking site Hucksters.net exposed McAuliffe as being the mastermind behind Crazy Days and Nights (CDAN), the infamous Hollywood blind gossip blog once believed to be run by Robert Downey Jr.

Education
McAuliffe graduated from Saint Louis Priory School, Wabash College, and Vanderbilt University Law School.

McAuliffe's Radio History

References

External links
 Page at RiezmanBerger law firm
 Chronicle of a Solution blog
 Personal blog

Living people
Year of birth missing (living people)
American entertainment lawyers
Lawyers from St. Louis
Missouri lawyers
Vanderbilt University Law School alumni
Wabash College alumni